Brachycerinae is a weevil subfamily in the family Brachyceridae.

Tribes 
Tribus group "Brachycerinae":
 Brachycerini - Brotheusini - Byrsopini - Protomantini

Tribus group "Erirhininae":
 Arthrostenini - Erirhinini - Himasthlophallini - Stenopelmini - Tanysphyrini - †Palaeoerirhinini

Tribus group "Ocladiinae":
 Desmidophorini - Ocladiini

Tribus group "Raymondionyminae":
 Myrtonymini - Raymondionymini

Tribus group "Tadiinae":
 Aonychusini - Tadiini

References 

 Billberg, G.J. 1820: Enumeratio Insectorum in Musaeo Gust. Joh. Billberg. Typis Gadelianis. Stockholm: [2 unn.] + 138 pp..
 Schönherr, C.J. 1825: Continuatio Tabulae synopticae Familiae Curculionidum. Isis von Oken, 1825(5): c. 581-588
 Atlas of the family Brachyceridae of Russia
 I.Löbl & A.Smetana (eds). 2011 Catalogue of Palearctic Coleoptera. Vol. 7: Curculionoidea I. Apollo Books, Stenstrup, Denmark. p. 182-185

External links 
  Biolib

 
Polyphaga subfamilies